The Eldorado Gaming Scioto Downs Columbus Blue Jackets Radio Network is an American radio network consisting of 36 radio stations which carry coverage of the Columbus Blue Jackets, a professional hockey team in the National Hockey League.

Columbus radio stations WBNS and WBNS-FM serve as the network's two flagship stations; WXZX Also serves as an alternate flagship in the event of schedule overlaps with Ohio State Sports Network football or basketball programming on both WBNS and WBNS-FM. The network also includes 21 affiliates in the U.S. states of Ohio and West Virginia: 17 AM stations, 8 of which extend their signals with low-power FM translators; and 4 full-power FM stations.

Bob McElligott serves as the play-by-play announcer; in addition to his duties, McElligott also handles the pre- and post-game shows alongside Dylan Tyrer. Eldorado Gaming Scioto Downs racino owns the naming rights to the network.

Station list

Blue background indicates low-power FM translator.
* WXZX serves as an "overflow" flagship station in the event of schedule overlaps with Ohio State Sports Network programming on WBNS-FM.

Network map(s)

References

National Hockey League on the radio
Sports radio networks in the United States